Pirate spiders, members of the  family Mimetidae, are araneomorph spiders which typically feed on other spiders.

The family Mimetidae contains roughly 200 species divided among 12 genera, of which Mimetus and Ero are the most common. Mimetids can be recognized by the rows of spine-like hairs on their long front legs; the rows consist of a long spine, followed by a series of progressively shorter ones.

Mimetidae usually hunt by picking at the strands on their prey's web to simulate the movements of either a trapped insect or a potential mate. When their prey comes to investigate, they are instead captured and eaten.  Some mimetids have been observed to feed on insects as well.  The spider-feeding habit presents problems in mating, and little is known about how the males court females to avoid being eaten.  However, some male mimetids in the genus Gelanor, found in South America, have enormously long appendages which they use to inseminate females.

Distribution
Pirate spiders are found in forests all around the globe, wherein the highest diversity is found in Central and Tropical South America.

Taxonomy
The Mimetidae are sometimes taxonomically grouped in the superfamilies Araneoidea or Palpimanoidea.

Genera
The categorization into subfamilies follows Joel Hallan's Biology Catalog.

 Gelaninae Simon, 1881
 Arochoides Mello-Leitão, 1935 (Brazil)
 Gelanor Thorell, 1869 (Central and South America)

 Melaenosiinae
 Kratochvilia Strand, 1934 (Principe)
 Melaenosia Simon, 1906 (India)

 Mimetinae Simon, 1881
 Arocha Simon, 1893 (Peru, Brazil)
 Australomimetus Heimer, 1986 (Australia)
 Ero C. L. Koch, 1836 (Palearctic, Africa, South America, USA, Asia, Australia)
 Mimetus Hentz, 1832 (worldwide)
 Phobetinus Simon, 1895 (Vietnam, Sri Lanka)
 Reo Brignoli, 1979 (USA, Kenya)

 Oarcinae Simon, 1890
 Gnolus Simon, 1879 (South America)
 Oarces Simon, 1879 (South America)

See also
 List of Mimetidae species
 Spider families

References

 Platnick, N.I. & Shabad, M.U. (1993). A review of the pirate spiders (Aranae, Mimetidae) of Chile. American Museum Novitates 3074. Abstract - PDF (12Mb) (with color pictures of O. reticulatus male and female, G. cordiformis m/f, G. blinkeni f, G. zonulatus f, G. spiculator f, H. collusor f; new description of G. blinkeni)

External links

Arachnology Home Pages: Araneae
Platnick, N.I. 2003. World Spider Catalog
Iziko, Museums of Cape Town